is a Japanese light novel series written by Miku and illustrated by Rein Kuwashima. It began as a web novel that started in the Kakuyomu website in March 2017. It was later acquired by Fujimi Shobo, who have published the series since December 2018 under their Fujimi Fantasia Bunko imprint.

A manga adaptation illustrated by Kazuomi Minatogawa has been serialized in ASCII Media Works' Dengeki PlayStation Comic Web website since December 2019, with its chapters collected into tankōbon volumes as of December 2022. An anime television series adaptation produced by TMS Entertainment and animated by Millepensee is set to premiere in April 2023.

Plot
Yuya Tenjo is an overweight, short and meek high schooler who is bullied at school and tormented by his family, except for his grandfather who is the only person who cares for him. When his grandfather dies and leaves Yuya as the sole inheritor of his house, his parents expel him from home and force him to live there alone, but inside the house, Yuya discovers a portal to another world, where he obtains the power to change his life forever.

Characters

 The main protagonist, he is a timid and unnatractive boy who is tormented by both his classmates and his family, until he inherits his grandfather's house, where he finds a portal to another world and powerful weapons from there. After killing a powerful monster using such weapons, Yuya discover that he can get stronger and obtain special powers by defeating such enemies like in a video game, the process also changing his appearance, becoming tall and handsome. Since then he travels back and forth between both worlds, using his newly obtained skills to improve himself, making friends and enemies along the way,

Daughter of the chairman of the prestigious Ousei Academy. She takes an interest in Yūya when he tries his best to defend her from some thugs before his transformation. Once meeting him again, Kaori invites Yuya to study at Ousei with her, to which he accepts. Since then she is his closest friend in school and has feelings for him.

The first princess of the Arselian Kingdom, which lies in the other world. After Yuya rescues her from a monster, she becomes infatuated with him and tries her best to win his affection.

A popular model who partnered with Yuya for a photoshoot and developed an interest in him since then.

Media

Light novel
Written by Miku, the series began publication online in the Kakuyomu website on March 25, 2017, under the tentative title . The series was later acquired by Fujimi Shobo, who began publishing the novels with illustrations by Rein Kuwashima starting on December 20, 2018, under their Fujimi Fantasia Bunko imprint. As of March 2023, thirteen volumes have been released.

In September 2021, Yen Press announced that they had licensed the novels for English publication.

A spin-off series titled I Got a Cheat Skill in Another World and Became Unrivaled in the Real World, Too: Girls Side, written by Ryō Kotohira and illustrated by Kuwashima, began publication under the Fantasia Bunko imprint on December 20, 2022. As of March 2023, two volumes have been released.

Main series

Spin-off

Manga
A manga adaptation illustrated by Kazuomi Minatogawa began serialization in ASCII Media Works' Dengeki PlayStation Comic Web website on December 13, 2019. As of December 2022, four tankōbon volumes have been released. Yen Press has also licensed the manga in English.

Anime
In August 2022, it was announced that the novels would be receiving an anime television series adaptation. The series is produced by TMS Entertainment and animated by Millepensee, with Shingo Tanabe directing, Shin Itagaki serving as chief director and supervising the scripts, Hiromi Kimura adapting Rein Kuwashima's character designs for animation and serving as chief animation director, and Akiyuki Tateyama composing the music. It is set to premiere on April 7, 2023, on Tokyo MX and other networks.

Game
A free-to-play MMORPG browser game, titled I Got a Cheat Skill in Another World and Became Unrivaled in the Real World Too: Parallel Universe, was announced on March 17, 2023. It will be launched on the G123 platform in multiple languages.

Reception
In May 2018, the web novel won the Grand Prize at the 3rd Kakuyomu Web Novel Contest in the Science Fiction/Modern Fantasy Division. As of February 2023, the series has 2 million copies in circulation.

See also
The Fruit of Evolution - Another light novel series by the same author

Notes

References

External links
  at Kakuyomu 
  
  
 

2018 Japanese novels
2022 Japanese novels
2023 anime television series debuts
Anime and manga about parallel universes
Anime and manga based on light novels
ASCII Media Works manga
Dengeki Comics
Fantasy anime and manga
Fujimi Fantasia Bunko
Japanese fantasy novels
Japanese webcomics
Kadokawa Dwango franchises
Light novels
Light novels first published online
Seinen manga
Upcoming anime television series
Tokyo MX original programming
Webcomics in print
Yen Press titles